Jules Fejer (22 January 1914 – 21 December 2002) was a Hungarian-born physicist.

Fejer was born in Budapest, Austria-Hungary on 22 January 1914, son of Ernest Fejer and Stella Popper.

As an engineer with South Africa's National Institute for Telecommunications Research (NITR), He published the first estimate of the life expectancy of the recently launched Sputnik in Nature.

His prediction was far more accurate than those made by the Russians, British and Americans.

In the late 1950s he wrote a fundamental paper on incoherent backscatter, explaining why the width of the backscattered echo was determined primarily by the ion thermal velocity rather than by the electron thermal velocity. He was one of a group of ionospheric physicists brought together by Henry G. Booker to start what became the Electrical and Computer Engineering department at the University of California, San Diego. He was elected a Fellow of the American Geophysical Union in 1990 and continued work with graduate students until 1995.

References

1914 births
2002 deaths
20th-century Hungarian physicists
Fellows of the American Geophysical Union
Hungarian expatriates in the United States